Saint Joseph I of Alexandria (Abba Yousab), 52nd Pope of Alexandria and Patriarch of the See of St. Mark.

He was the son of one of the rich nobles of Menouf, Egypt. After his parents died, some believers raised him. As an adult, he gave most of his money as alms and went to the desert of St. Macarius the Great and became a monk. When Abba Marcus II became the 49th Pope of Alexandria, he summoned Yousab, ordained him a priest and sent him back. He stayed in the desert until the death of Abba Simon II, 51st Pope.

The papal throne remained unoccupied, and Abba Yousab was chosen Pope. He bought properties out of his own pocket, and bestowed them on the churches. Abba Yousab condemned actions of bishops of Tanes and Miser (Cairo); they were excommunicated.

He died after 19 years in office, having been a monk for 39 years since the age of 20.

References

9th-century Coptic Orthodox popes of Alexandria
9th-century Christian saints
Coptic Orthodox saints